Ibb University was established in Ibb as an official university in 1996. It was founded by Nasser al-Awlaki.

The university consists of 11 faculties:

 Faculty of Medicine and Health Science
 Faculty of Dentistry
 Faculty of Engineering and Architecture
 Faculty of Science
 Faculty of Agriculture and Veterinary Medicine
 Faculty of Administrative Sciences
 Faculty of Education
 Faculty of Education – Al-Nadirah
 Faculty of Arts
 Faculty of Law
 Faculty of Specific - Al-Saddah

Centres:
 Centre for Development and Quality Assurance
 Centre for Computer and Information Technology
 Centre for Languages and Translation
 Centre for Psychological and Educational Counselling
 Engineering Consultancy Centre
 Centre for Educational Training
 Centre for Environment and Chemical Security
 Centre for Research and Studies

References

External links
 Ibb University

Universities in Yemen
Educational institutions established in 1996
1996 establishments in Yemen